John Clavie or Clavee (died 1607) was a Scottish apothecary who worked for James VI and I and the royal family.

Clavie was based in Edinburgh and moved with the court to London on the Union of the Crowns. He was probably related to "Jhone Clavie" or "Clavye" (died 1586), a candlemaker who supported Mary, Queen of Scots in the Marian Civil War. The candlemaker John Clavie and his business partners were censured for exporting tallow in March 1569.

In April 1598, Edinburgh burgh hosted a banquet for Anne of Denmark's brother, Ulrik, Duke of Holstein, at the house of Ninian MacMorran at Riddle's court. Two apothecaries, John Lawtie and John Clavie sweetened and added spices to wine to make Hippocras. A third apothecary, Alexander Barclay made two pints of "vergeis" and a mutchkin of perfumed rose water.

Clavie was appointed an apothecary in ordinary to King James in March 1603, and appointed to serve Anne of Denmark, Prince Henry and the other royal children on 19 July.

John Clavie died in 1607. He was replaced in the royal household by Lewis Lemire, an apothecary from Flanders.

He married Marie Aldinstoun. After Clavie's death, she married Patrick Livingstone, feuar of Saltcoats.

References

1607 deaths
Court of James VI and I
Household of Anne of Denmark
People in health professions from Edinburgh
Scottish apothecaries